Antheraea larissa is a silkworm moth of the family Saturniidae found in Sundaland. The species was first described by Westwood in 1847. The larvae feed on the endangered tree Shorea glauca.

References

Antheraea
Moths of Asia
Moths described in 1847